Wold Newton is a small Yorkshire Wolds village and civil parish in the East Riding of Yorkshire, England. Wold Newton is located within the Great Wold Valley and the course of the Gypsey Race, a winterbourne chalk stream, passes through the south of the village. The village of Fordon is also part of the civil parish of Wold Newton. According to the 2011 UK census, Wold Newton parish had a population of 337, an increase on the 2001 UK census figure of 291.

The parish church of All Saints is a Grade II* listed building. There are a further eight Grade II listed buildings including Wold Newton Hall, the former Wesleyan Chapel (now Wold Newton Community Centre), The Old Vicarage, the Anvil Arms Public House and the Red telephone box on Wold Newton Green. Approximately two thirds of the village falls within the Wold Newton Conservation area.

Wold Newton has a small, fully automated telephone exchange. Rather confusingly, this is referred to as the "Thwing Exchange". (Thwing is a neighbouring village). Wold Newton Cricket Club have a ground off Laking Lane and field a first and second team.

The children's author Christina Butler lived for many years in the western section of Wold Newton Hall. Between 1988 and 2005 she wrote thirteen books including Stanley in the Dark and Archie the Ugly Dinosaur.

History

Neolithic round barrow
To the south of the village, close to the Gypsy Race stands a neolithic round barrow. It was excavated in 1894 by John Robert Mortimer when it was discovered that the monument had initially composed a large timber structure onto which several bodies had been laid along with pottery and flints. The Great Wold Valley was a site of considerable neolithic activity, also containing the barrows of Duggleby Howe and Willy Howe as well as the Rudston Monolith. The barrow has been a Scheduled Ancient Monument since 1962.

Bronze Age bowl barrows
Two bowl barrows are located to the west of Wold Newton Green. Both also saw use during mediaeval times as archery target butts, lending their name to the adjacent Butt Lane. They are now Scheduled Ancient Monuments.

Wold Newton hoard

In 2014 the metal detectorist David Blakely discovered a pottery container holding 1857 copper coins dating from the early 4th century AD. It was acquired by the Yorkshire Museum in 2016 and went on public display in 2017.

Origins of village

Wold Newton is an Anglian name denoting a new farmstead.

Enclosure

The land around Warrington was enclosed in 1776. The current channel of the Gypsy Race was defined at this time.

Wold Cottage meteorite

On 13 December 1795 a meteorite crashed on the outskirts of the village, landing within metres of ploughman John Shipley. As a monument to this event there is a brick column bearing the inscription. The meteorite is now housed in the Natural History Museum. The event inspired the development of the body of science fiction literature known as the Wold Newton family by American author Philip José Farmer.

Administrative history
From the mediaeval era until the 19th century Wold Newton was part of Dickering Wapentake.

Between 1894 and 1974 Wold Newton was a part of the Bridlington Rural District, in the East Riding of Yorkshire. Between 1974 and 1996 it was part of the Borough of North Wolds (later Borough of East Yorkshire), in the county of Humberside.

The 1974 reforms to local government saw the parish form the northernmost tip of the new county of Humberside. The southern tip comprised the village of Wold Newton, Lincolnshire in Lincolnshire. Since 1996 Wold Newton is covered by the unitary East Riding of Yorkshire Council.

References

External links

 
 

 
Villages in the East Riding of Yorkshire
Civil parishes in the East Riding of Yorkshire